The Rugby Lions, nicknamed The Lions, is an English rugby union club based in Rugby, Warwickshire. The club plays its home matches at Webb Ellis Road. Its developmental squad is known as the Crusaders. The club also has a ladies team known as the Lionesses.  It currently competes in Counties 3 Midlands East (South) at the ninth tier of the English rugby union system, having been readmitted to the league pyramid from at the start of the 2022-23 season.

History 
The Rugby Lions is one of only three rugby union teams in England permitted to wear an all-white strip, with England National Rugby Union Team, and Rugby School, being the others. In recent times, the Lions have not exercised this right, with the home kit normally using black shorts. For the final game of the 2011–12 season against Hinckley however, the Lions appeared in white shorts as well.  In a four-year span from April 2011 to September 2015, the Lions did not lose a single league fixture, winning all 60 matches in that period before their run was ended by a 31-35 defeat at Ledbury RFC in the 2015-16 season opener.

On 17 August 2012, the Rugby Advertiser released an announcement, within which was an RFU statement, which confirmed that the Lions had failed to pay off their debts in time, and had been removed from National League 2 South. It did not however say anything concerning whether or not the Lions would still compete in any division in 2012–13.  At a public meeting held on 30 August, attended by over 200 people, club owner David Owen revealed that the Lions would indeed not be competing in any league for the 2012–13 season, but would instead be organising a series of friendlies. The club used the help of many supporters and local clubs to help out. With many of those present at the meeting putting their names down to volunteer. Twenty fixtures had to be fulfilled to demonstrate that the club was able to put out a side and run successfully as a club. Many former players including the clubs 'tailenders' team came together to enable the Lions to fulfill those matches.

In May 2013, it was announced that the Lions' bid to be accepted back into the RFU league system had been successful, although they were forced to rejoin at the lowest possible level, Midlands 5 West (South).  On 9 August 2013, it was announced that the Lions would be featured on BT Sport's rugby programming into the new season; with the Lions' First XV travelling to the studio to participate in filming on the indoor pitch.

Club honours
National League 2 North champions: 1987-88
Courage League National Division Two champions: 1990-91
National League 3 Midlands champions (2): 2005-06, 2011–12
Warwickshire Shield Winners: (2): 2011-12, 2014–15
Midlands 5 West (South) champions: 2013-14
Midlands Junior Vase Winners: (2): 2013-14, 2014–15
Midlands 4 West (South) champions: 2014-15
Clonmel Cup Winners: 2014-15
Midlands 3 West (South) champions: 2015-16
Midlands 2 West (South) champions: 2016-17

2011–12 season
In July 2011, businessman – and ex-player – Michael Aland bought the club, with an ambition to becoming a Premiership side in around 5 years. Soon after, he recruited several highly experienced players and coaches, including Neil Back (Head Coach) and Ben Gollings (Player/Backs Coach). Having been relegated to the National League 3 Midlands previous season, most players from the previous season had left the club. Players who remained with the club included Nick Walton, Ben Nuttall, Callum Tucker, Fraser Tait, Matt Mountford, Neil Davies, Paul Davies and Jack Young. This meant that almost all of the entire 2011–12 squad had to be either bought or promoted from the youth team. Some of the players brought in had been at the club before, such as Ade Hales and Beau Carney. 
The new additions worked, with the Lions winning every game in the first half of the season, a run they carried on into 2012. The league title was secured with two games remaining on 31 March 2012 in the home game against Dudley Kingswinford, with the Lions triumphing 19–14. The Lions also won the Warwickshire Cup, winning 10–9 in the final against Sutton Coldfield.

Notable players (past and present)
{|
|- style="vertical-align:top"
||
 Nick Adams (Ex-Montauban and Wasps)
 Steve Brain (13 England caps)
 Ben Gollings (All-time top Sevens points scorer)
 Leigh Hinton (Ex-Leeds)
 Launcelot Percival (3 England caps)
 Andy Vilk (England Sevens)
 Peter Wackett (Ex-Leeds)
 Mark Mapletoft (Ex Gloucester and Harlequins)
 To'o Vaega (Samoa National team)
 Eddie Saunders (All time record club try scorer)
 Walter Little (50 New Zealand caps)

Seasons

Key

P = Played
W = Games won
D = Games drawn
L = Games lost
F = Points for
A = Points against
Pts = Points
Pos = Final position

NL2N = National League 2 North
MP = Midlands Premier
M1E = Midlands 1 East
M1W = Midlands 1 West
M2WS = Midlands 2 West (South)
M3WS = Midlands 3 West (South)
M4WS = Midlands 4 West (South)
M5WS = Midlands 5 West (South)

NL Cup = National League Cup
Warks Cup = Warwickshire Cup
Mid Jnr Vase = Junior Vase Midlands Section
Jnr Vase = Junior Vase
Mid Int Vase = Intermediate Cup Midlands Section
Warks Shield = Warwickshire Shield
Clon Cup = Clonmel Cup

W = Winner
RU = Runner-Up
F = Final
SF = Semi-Finals
QF = Quarter-Finals
R3 = Third Round
R2 = Second Round
R1 = First Round

Season results

References

External links
 Official club website

 
Premiership Rugby teams
English rugby union teams
Rugby clubs established in 1873
Rugby union in Warwickshire
Rugby, Warwickshire